Route 273 is a short 21 km  long, two-lane north/south highway on the south shore of the Saint Lawrence River in Quebec, Canada. Its northern terminus is in Saint-Antoine-de-Tilly at the junction of Route 132, and the southern terminus is at the junction of Route 269 near Saint-Gilles.

Towns along Route 273

 Saint-Antoine-de-Tilly
 Saint-Apollinaire
 Saint-Agapit

See also
 List of Quebec provincial highways

References

External links 
 Provincial Route Map (Courtesy of the Quebec Ministry of Transportation) 
 Route 273 on Google Maps

273